Mid-term parliamentary elections were held in Cuba on 1 November 1956 in order to fill half the seats in the Senate and House of Representatives.

References

Cuba
Parliamentary elections in Cuba
1956 in Cuba
One-party elections
November 1956 events in North America
Election and referendum articles with incomplete results